Lorenz Hilkes (born 31 August 1950) is a retired German football player. He spent two seasons in the Bundesliga with Borussia Mönchengladbach and VfB Stuttgart. He later played in the North American Soccer League for the Edmonton Drillers, and in both the NASL and Major Indoor Soccer League for the San Diego Sockers.

Honours
 UEFA Cup winner: 1974–75
 Bundesliga champion: 1974–75
 Bundesliga runner-up: 1973–74
 NASL indoor champion: 1981–82, 1983–84
 MISL champion: 1982–83

References

External links
 
 NASL/MISL stats

1950 births
Living people
German footballers
Bundesliga players
2. Bundesliga players
Borussia Mönchengladbach players
UEFA Cup winning players
VfB Stuttgart players
SpVgg Greuther Fürth players
VVV-Venlo players
Edmonton Drillers (1979–1982) players
Major Indoor Soccer League (1978–1992) players
North American Soccer League (1968–1984) players
North American Soccer League (1968–1984) indoor players
San Diego Sockers (NASL) players
San Diego Sockers (original MISL) players
Association football forwards
20th-century German people